Belize Inlet is an inlet on the Central Coast of British Columbia, Canada, located to the north of and adjoining Seymour Inlet.

Definition

Name origin

References

Fjords of British Columbia
Central Coast of British Columbia
Inlets of British Columbia